Tarakeswar Municipality is the civic body that governs Tarakeswar and its surrounding areas in the Chandannagore subdivision of Hooghly district, West Bengal, India.

History
Tarakeswar Municipality was established in 1975.

Geography
Tarakeswar Municipality covers an area of 3.88 sq km and has a total population of 31,344 (2011).
Tarakeswar Municipality is bounded by Bhanjipur gram panchayat on the north, Baligori I gram panchayat on the east, Ramnagar gram panchayat on the south and Sontoshpur gram panchayat on the west. It is located in the centre of Tarakeswar CD Block.

Elections
In the 2015 municipal elections for Tarakeswar Municipality Trinamool Congress won all the 15 seats.

In the 2010 municipal elections for Tarakeswar Municipality Trinamool Congress won 10 seats and CPI (M) 5 seats.

About the 2010 municipal elections, The Guardian wrote, "Today's municipal elections are unlike any for decades: the Communists, who have held West Bengal's main towns almost without a break since the 1970s, are facing disaster… This time defeat is likely to be definitive and could signal the beginning of the end for the Communist Party of India-Marxist (CPIM)."

In the 2005 municipal elections for Tarakeswar Municipality, CPI (M) won 11 seats and Marxist Forward Bloc 4 seats.

References

 

Municipalities of West Bengal